The Sadanic languages are Bihari languages in the Indo-Aryan languages. The languages are mostly spoken in the Jharkhand state of India.

Etymology
The Nagpuri language is known as Sadani as native language of Sadan, the Indo-Aryan ethnolinguistic group of Chotanagpur. Sadani also referred to closely related  Indo-Aryan languages of Jharkhand such as Nagpuri, Panchpargania, Kurmali and Khortha. The origin of the word Sadan is somewhat obscure.

History
The Indo Aryan languages of Jharkhand such as Nagpuri, Panchpargania, Kurmali, Khortha are known as Sadani languages. Earlier linguist had classified these languages as dialects of Bhojpuri and Magahi language. But recent research suggest that these languages are developed from a single ancient language in the past and are closer to each other than any other languages. Their differences are due to their geographical distribution and contact with different tribal Munda languages.

According to scholars, the Sadri/Nagpuri language was in contact with the Mundari language. Due to widespread use as a lingua franca, it lost ergativity as Munda languages have no ergativity. It gained  attributive possession between alienable and inalienable in third person possessor. It lacks loan words from Dravidian and Austroasiatic languages but contributed countless loan words in its contact languages. According to Abbi (1997), Indo-Aryan languages influenced Dravidian and Austroasiatic languages. The converse marker of Kharia (-ke, -kon) and Kurukh (-ki) is due to influence from Indo-Aryan language.

The Khortha language has large numbers of borrowing from Santali language. 
Kurmali has several loan words from an extinct unknown language and few loan words from Santali. Panchparganiya does not have large numbers of loan words. It retain its morphological ergativity and did not develop an alienable or inalienable distinction in attributive possession.

References

Languages of India
Eastern Indo-Aryan languages
Bihari languages